The Cape long-billed lark (Certhilauda curvirostris), also known as the Cape lark, Cape longbill or long-billed lark is a species of lark in the family Alaudidae. It is found in south-western Africa. Its natural habitats are semi-arid Karoo shrub and subtropical dry shrubland and subtropical or dry lowland and highveld grassland. This lark is also found in croplands, farmlands and coastal fynbos.

Taxonomy and systematics
The Cape long-billed lark was originally placed in the genus Alauda (as A. curvirostris).

Subspecies 
Two subspecies are recognized: 
 C. c. falcirostris - Reichenow, 1916: Originally described as a separate species. Found in south-western Namibia to western South Africa
 C. c. curvirostris - (Hermann, 1783): Found in south-western South Africa

Additionally, some authorities consider several other species to be either presently or formerly as subspecies of the Cape long-billed lark:
 Karoo long-billed lark (as C. c. damarensis, C. c. bradshawi, C. c. subcoronata and C. c. gilli). 
 Benguela long-billed lark (as C. c. benguelensis)
 Eastern long-billed lark (as C. c. semitorquata). 
 Agulhas long-billed lark (as C. c. brevirostris).

References

External links

 Image and Classification at Animal Diversity Web
 Cape long-billed lark - Species text in The Atlas of Southern African Birds.

Cape long-billed lark
Fauna of South Africa
Cape long-billed lark
Taxonomy articles created by Polbot